Stomaphis is a genus of true bugs belonging to the family Aphididae.

The species of this genus are found in Europe.

Species:
 Stomaphis abieticola Sorin, 2012 
 Stomaphis aceris Takahashi, 1960

References

Aphididae